DWRN (657 AM) Radyo Pilipino is a radio station owned and operated by Radyo Pilipino Media Group through its licensee Philippine Radio Corporation. The station's studio and transmitter are located along Pan-Philippine Hi-way, Naga, Camarines Sur.

References

Radio stations in Naga, Camarines Sur
Radio stations established in 1983